The 1868 Collingwood by-election was a by-election held on 18 March 1868 in the  electorate during the 4th New Zealand Parliament.

The by-election was caused by the resignation of the incumbent MP Andrew Richmond on 7 February 1868.

The by-election was won by Arthur Collins, by the narrow margin of three votes.

Results

References

Collingwood 1868
1868 elections in New Zealand
Politics of the Tasman District
March 1868 events